James A. Herrick (born October 6, 1954) is an American academic. He is the Guy Vanderjagt Professor of Communication and former communication chair at Hope College.

Herrick’s research interests include rhetoric and argumentation, new religious movements, technology and spirituality, and the discourse of futurism. His early books are guides to the discipline of scholarly argumentation that discuss both traditional rhetorical techniques and contemporary applications for students and academics. He has written extensively on the history of rhetoric, from the theories of the ancient Greeks to modern Western thought, and more specifically on the revolutionary rhetorical practices of the seventeenth- and eighteenth-century English Deists.

Herrick’s research also deals with the birth of “synthesized” religions that differ from traditional Christian doctrine. He has worked on the intersection of science and religion, and particularly on the new forms of spirituality that have risen in an increasingly technological age. Most recently, he collaborated with Michael Hyde to co-edit After the Genome: A Language for our Biotechnological Future (2013), an award-winning volume of essays that examines the ways in which language and rhetoric inform people’s understanding of biotechnology.

Early life and education
Herrick was raised in a household in which argument—intellectual debate, rather than heated dispute—was highly valued. He cites this upbringing as the source of his interest in rhetoric.
He graduated Magna cum laude from California State University, Fresno in 1976. He then received his MA from the University of California, Davis in 1979. His PhD was granted by the University of Wisconsin–Madison in 1984.

Career
Herrick has taught at Hope College since earning his PhD in 1984. His courses have included Analytic Skills in Communication, Rhetoric and Public Culture, Biotechnology and Human Enhancement, and Rhetorical and Communication Theory. He also taught at LCC International University in Klaipeda, Lithuania during the spring semester of 2004.

Religious beliefs and academic philosophy
Herrick is interested in the relationship between Christianity and rhetoric, and sees argumentation as the basis of Christian culture. In his view, this philosophy forms the core of his teaching and scholarship.

Herrick views rhetoric as "architechtonic".
 organizes and structures other arts and disciplines
 it's a kind of master discipline that controls all others
 says that if rhetoric is the study of how we organize and use language effectively, then it is also a study of how we organize our thinking on various subjects, that is, all ideas are packaged rhetorically

Herrick wanted everyone to recognize "the pervasiveness of persuasiveness" and defines rhetoric as "the systematic study and intentional practice of effective symbolic expression" 

He states that "rhetoric is the art of employing symbols effectively," and that 'effective' means achieving the purpose of the symbol-user. The categories in which this effectiveness can be judged include persuasion, clarity, beauty, and mutual understanding.

Critical reception
Herrick’s scholarly output has met with much critical appreciation in the academic community. Of Herrick’s 1997 book, The Radical Rhetoric of the English Deists, Lester C. Olson of the University of Pittsburgh wrote, “It is...an important contribution to eighteenth-century studies and scholarship on the history of Britain.” James W. Sire called 2003’s The Making of the New Spirituality “[a] lucid intellectual history with important implications for navigating the religious currents of our day.”

Awards and acknowledgment
 Wisconsin Alumni Research Foundation Fellow; May 1982.
 Communication Arts Teaching Award for Graduate Students; 1982.
 University of Wisconsin Graduate Foreign Travel Award; 1982.
 Excellence in Teaching Award, University of Wisconsin; April 1984. (Five such awards presented each year to teaching assistants.)
 Lilly Scholar, October 1993.
 Nominated by Hope College for Council for the Support and Advancement of Education (CASE), Michigan Professor of the Year Award, 1997.
 John and Ruth Reed Faculty Achievement Award, Hope College, January 2007.
 Favorite Faculty Award, Hope College, student body vote, October 2007.
 Selected for inclusion in Religionsource, international media guide to scholars in religion, American Academy of Religion, 2008.
 Elected Senior Fellow of truthXchange, San Diego-based Christian organization monitoring new religious movements, January 2014.

Books
 
 
 
 
 
 
 , co-edited with Michael Hyde
The Religion of Posthumanity, in development

Articles
 “Basketball, Economics, and Christianity in a New Europe.” Cresset, 2004. 
 “Antecedents of the New Age Movement,” Areopagus Journal, Summer 2006. 
 “Science Fiction’s Brave New World,” cover story, Christianity Today, February 2009.

References

1954 births
Living people
Hope College faculty
University of California, Davis alumni